Insiders is a Franco-Belgian comics series written by Jean-Claude Bartoll, illustrated by Renaud Garreta and published by Dargaud in French and Cinebook in English.

Volumes

Guérilla tchétchène - 09/2002  
Opération Offshore - 06/2003  
Missiles pour Islamabad - 09/2004  
Le piège afghan - 06/2005  
O.P.A. sur le Kremlin - 12/2006   	
Destination goulag - 12/2007  
Les dragons de Pékin - 03/2009   	
Le prince rouge - 11/2009

Translations

Since July 2009, Cinebook Ltd has been publishing Insiders. Three albums have been released so far:

Chechen Guerrilla (includes 'Operation Offshore') - July 2009  
Missiles for Islamabad - May 2010  
The Afghan Trap - October 2010

References

Dargaud titles
Bandes dessinées
French comics
Action comics
French graphic novels
Thriller comics